was a Japanese photographer.

References
Nihon shashinka jiten / 328 Outstanding Japanese Photographers. Kyoto: Tankōsha, 2000. . 

Japanese photographers
1902 births
1977 deaths